Madventures is a Finnish travel documentary television program that concentrates on backpacking in the most off-the-beaten-path destinations on the planet. It is presented by Riku Rantala and Tuomas "Tunna" Milonoff. As the show's director and cameramen, they travel around the world exploring different cultures. They emphasize that they are on a journey, not on a holiday. The show often features local practices that are culturally unacceptable or controversial where the episodes air, to the point where the showmakers have been accused of deliberate, excessive use of shock imagery.

The show premiered in Finland on the channel Sub, on 13 October 2002. Its international premiere was in the United States on the Travel Channel on 21 September 2009. The United Kingdom premiere on Fiver is not yet decided. Originally Internationally, Madventures is distributed by the Target Entertainment Group.

The show includes a "MadCook" section, in which the travellers attempt to eat some of the least favoured dishes around the world — for example, monkey brains in the Amazon Rainforest and dog meat in Bali. Another light hearted feature are the waking up scenes, where Milonoff will often shock Rantala while he is still asleep in bed.

Production

The travel documentary is made on a relatively low budget with no major production crew but rather just the two presenters travelling together with the film equipment.

Riku Rantala is the writer, presenter and producer of the program, while Tuomas "Tunna" Milonoff directs and films.

The first two seasons were made in Finnish, but for international audiences, season three of the show was sold to the Travel Channel and Fiver and the language was switched to English. The third series was broadcast starting in Finland in early April 2009 with each episode being ten minutes longer than the international version.

Episodes 

The program started as a gonzo documentary about the backpacking culture and the travel stories of the protagonists. The second series added a bit more social criticism to the mix whereas the third series concentrates on cultural and sociological extremes.

The following is a comprehensive list of Madventures episodes, excluding DVD extras. The original runtime of episodes was 50 minutes. For the second series the channel decided to halve the duration of episodes.

Season 1 (2002) 
 Nepal – Kathmandu
 Nepal – Kathmandu, Chitwan, Annapurna
 India – Varanasi, Delhi, Rajasthan
 India – Pushkar, Rishikesh
 India – Goa / Cambodia – Phnom Penh
 Cambodia – Phnom Penh, Siam Reap, Sihanoukville
 Thailand – Koh Phangan, Koh Tao
 Thailand – Koh Tao, Bangkok, Krabi
 Indonesia – Medan, Lake Toba, Bali / Malesia – Penang / Singapore
 Indonesia – Bali, Sumba
 Indonesia – Sumba, Bali
 Australia – Sydney / New Zealand – Auckland / Tonga
 Tonga
 Tonga – Peru
 Amazonia
 Peru & Ecuador
 USA – California
 USA – Las Vegas
 USA – Las Vegas – Memphis
 Finland – Helsinki
 Mad Cook Special 1
 Mad Cook Special 2
 Madventures – Pahimmat iskut 1
 Madventures – Pahimmat iskut 2

Season 2 (2005) 
 Jamaica
 Tokyo
 Japan
 China
 Tibet
 West Papua
 Cuba
 Africa 1
 Africa 2
 Indochina 1
 Indochina 2
 Mad Cook Special
 Best of Madventures II
 Madventures Radalla (Loaded)
 Madventures Koukussa (Hooked)

Season 3 (2009, Finnish broadcast)

 Amazonas
 Ex-CCCP
 West Africa
 Felix Arabia
 Nippon
 Hindustan
 China
 Papua Niugini
 Philippines
 Southeast Asia - Burma, Thailand & Vietnam

Season 3 (2009, Travel Channel broadcast)
 Brazil (September 21)
 Southeast Asia (September 21)
 Japan (September 28)
 Russia/Ukraine (September 28)
 Philippines (October 5)
 China (October 12)
 Papua New Guinea (October 19)
 India (Re:Releasing in 2010)
 Togo/Benin (Re:Releasing in 2010)
 Yemen (Re:Releasing in 2010)

Reception and awards 

Rantala and Milonoff strongly opposed Animalia's decision in public, calling it hypocritical and pusillanimous, as one of the story's points was to criticize western industrial farming. According to Madventures production team, they want to provoke and to create discussion about intolerance, neoconservatism and moralism.

In 2005, the second series was awarded with an Entertainment Special-Venla and two Media & Message awards in different categories. In the same event Madventures won the best television programme of 2008 award. Both awards were decided in a vote by television viewers.

In January 2009, the hosts were selected as the Travel Persons of the Year by the Finnish Guild of Travel Journalists. The award, which has been given out since 1972, was presented in the Matka 2009 Nordic Travel Fair.

Releases

All the seasons have been released on DVD with extras. Series 2 box set includes subtitles in English. Series 3 has two separate DVD boxes for English and Finnish viewers. Both boxes include over four hours of unaired footage.

See also
Taboo, a similar show on the National Geographic Channel
Departures (TV series), a backpacker adventure journal.

References

External links
 Official homepage
 Madventures Travel Channel page
 

Finnish television shows
Travel television series
2000s documentary television series
Travel Channel original programming
Adventure travel
2000s Finnish television series
Sub (TV channel) original programming
Finnish non-fiction television series